Globularia is an extinct genus of sea snails, marine gastropod molluscs in the family Ampullinidae.

Species
Species within the genus Globularia include:
 †Globularia brevispira  Cox 1930
 †Globularia carlei  Finlay 1927
 †Globularia catanlilensis  Weaver 1931
 †Globularia compressa  Basterot 1825
 †Globularia coxi  Stefanini 1939
 †Globularia fischeri  Dall 1892
 †Globularia formosa  Morris and Lycett 1851
 †Globularia gibberosa  Grateloup 1847
 †Globularia grossa  Deshayes 1864
 †Globularia hatimi  Abbass 1972
 †Globularia hemisphaerica  Roemer 1836
 †Globularia morrisi  Cox and Arkell 1949
 †Globularia sanctistephani  Cossmann and Peyrot 1919
 †Globularia sireli  Okan and Hosgor 2008
 †Globularia sulcata  Cox 1930
 †Globularia vapincana  d'Orbigny 1850
 †Globularia vredenburgi  Cox 1927
 †Globularia zemmourensis  Cox 1969

 not accepted names 
 †Globularia fluctuata (Sowerby I, 1825), accepted as Cernina fluctuata (Sowerby I, 1825)

Fossils of the sea snails within this genus have been found all over the world in sediments from Jurassic to Miocene  (age range: 189.6 to 5.332 million years ago).

References

Globularia